The Pittsburgh Pike was an early toll road in the United States. The road was chartered as the Harrisburg and Pittsburgh Turnpike in 1805, and upon completion on May 20, 1818, it allowed travelers to go from Pittsburgh to Harrisburg, Pennsylvania over the Allegheny Mountains, cutting freight rates in half because wagons increased their capacity, speed, and certainty. Private interests contributed 62 percent of the capital; state government provided the rest. It cost $4,805 per mile to build. In 1814, the company was broken up into five constituent parts:

 Greensburg and Pittsburgh Turnpike, Pittsburgh to Greensburg
 Somerset and Greensburg Turnpike, Greensburg to Stoystown
 Bedford and Somerset Turnpike, Stoystown to Bedford
 Chambersburg and Bedford Turnpike, Bedford to Chambersburg
 Harrisburg, Carlisle, and Chambersburg Turnpike

Of these turnpikes, the former four were included in the Lincoln Highway, and later PA 1 and US 30. The Chambersburg and Harrisburg was not included in any major auto trails, but was included in PA 13, and later US 11

See also
 Susquehanna and Tioga Turnpike

References

Former toll roads in Pennsylvania